The AIC Serie A Young Footballer of the Year was a yearly award organized by the Italian Footballers' Association (AIC) given to the under-24 footballer who was considered to have performed the best over the previous Serie A season. It was organised by  the Italian Footballers' Association (AIC) as part of the Oscar del Calcio awards event.

Antonio Cassano is the only multiple winner of the award, winning it in 2001 and 2003. Roma had the most winners with three players from the club winning the award. The first non-Italian to win the award was the Slovak Marek Hamšík in 2008.

Winners

By club

By country

By position

References

External links 
 List of Oscar del Calcio winners on the AIC official website
 List of Gran Galà del Calcio winners on the AIC official website

Serie A trophies and awards
Association football young player of the year awards
Oscar del Calcio
Awards established in 1997
Lists of footballers in Italy
Association football player non-biographical articles
Rookie player awards